Trygve Bornø (born 2 February 1942) is a retired Norwegian international footballer.

Active career
His career began in Harstad IL, but he made his name with Skeid where he played 419 matches between 1964 and 1978.

VG awarded him the Player of the Year title in 1969.

Between 1966 and 1972 he was capped 43 times for the Norwegian national team.

Honours
 Norwegian Premier League:
 Winner (1): 1966

Non-playing career
After ending his active career he worked as secretary general for the Norwegian Football Association, from 1983 to 1985.

References

1942 births
Living people
People from Harstad
Norwegian footballers
Norway international footballers
Skeid Fotball players
Harstad IL players
Association football midfielders
Sportspeople from Troms og Finnmark